The Code Breaker: Jennifer Doudna, Gene Editing, and the Future of the Human Race is a non-fiction book authored by American historian and journalist Walter Isaacson. Published in March 2021 by Simon & Schuster, it is a biography of Jennifer Doudna, the winner of the 2020 Nobel Prize in Chemistry for her work on the CRISPR system of gene editing.

The book debuted at number one on The New York Times nonfiction best-seller list for the week ending March 13, 2021.

Promotion 
On March 22, 2021, Isaacson appeared on The Late Show with Stephen Colbert to discuss the book.

Reception 
In its starred review, Kirkus Reviews called it a "vital book about the next big thing in science—and yet another top-notch biography from Isaacson."

Publishers Weekly called it a "gripping account of a great scientific advancement and of the dedicated scientists who realized it."

References

External links 
The Code Breaker at the Simon & Schuster website
CRISPR Scientist's Biography Explores Ethics Of Rewriting The Code Of Life. Author interview, audio and transcript. Fresh Air, NPR, March 8, 2021.

2021 non-fiction books
Books about scientists
Jennifer Doudna
Simon & Schuster books
American biographies
Genetics books
Genome editing